The Interdisciplinary Prizes of the Royal Society of Chemistry recognize work at the interface between chemistry and other disciplines. Up to three prizes are awarded annually: Each winner receives £5000 and a medal, and completes a UK lecture tour.

Winners
Source:

See also

 List of chemistry awards

References

Awards of the Royal Society of Chemistry